Splicing factor, arginine/serine-rich 17A is a protein that in humans is encoded by the SFRS17A gene.

References

Further reading